Marc Vaux (born 29 November 1932, Swindon) is a British artist who rose to prominence in the 1960s. His work was included in the seminal Situation exhibition of 1960 alongside Robyn Denny, William Turnbull and Bernard Cohen among others. This exhibition was a direct reaction by British abstract artists to the recent exhibitions in London of the American Abstract Expressionists in particular the Tate's 1959 exhibition The New American Painting.  Although originally headed for a career in Chemistry, Vaux eventually studied at the Slade School of Fine Art from 1957 to 1960 where he was awarded a Boise traveling scholarship which allowed him to travel in Italy, and later to work at the Jean Ponsa lithographic printing studio in Paris.

In 1986, after a long teaching career he was appointed Head of Painting at the Central/St Martins College of Art and Design in London where he stayed until he retired in 1989 to concentrate full-time on painting.

Vaux's work has variously been described as minimalist and constructivist although since his primary interest is in colour and light he has more in common with the American west coast artists than the New York minimalists.

Marc Vaux said: It [colour] is known to have a direct effect upon the central nervous system/human sensibility, arguably the most effective modifiers of human response, over sound and touch. It is dynamic - dependent on degree of colour, light, surrounding colours. Given the facts it is surprising it has taken so long to come to the position of recognising the effective power of colour alone – the endless potential of colour alone to communicate, affect and modify response.. it can be a pure visual experience equivalent to any other (experience). The nearest equivalent would be the sound of music. I see no reason why colour can't equate with melody and be as memorable. After all Albers wrote poems to equate with his paintings.

A monograph Marc Vaux was written by Vaux's long term supporter Norbert Lynton and published by 21 Publishing in 2005.

The Tate Gallery holds a good collection of Vaux's work from 1959 to the present day.

Vaux's first commercial gallery exhibition was at the Grabowski Gallery in London with his then wife Tess Jaray. He was subsequently represented by the Axiom Gallery, Anderson O'Day and then the Redfern Gallery, since 1998 Marc Vaux has been represented by the London art dealer Bernard Jacobson and has had regular exhibitions there.

Exhibition History

References

External links
 Marc Vaux at WikiArt.org
 Marc Vaux at The ArtStack

Alumni of the Slade School of Fine Art
20th-century English painters
English male painters
21st-century English painters
1932 births
Living people
20th-century English male artists
21st-century English male artists